The Biafra Zionist Front (BZF), formerly known as the Biafra Zionist Movement, is a group agitating for the restoration of Biafra and its independence from Nigeria. It is led by Benjamin Onwuka. The movement's purpose is the actualization of the sovereign state of Biafra along precolonial lines.

The group claims to be supported by Israel and the United States, and Zionism is the official ideology of the organization.

History 
The group was formerly part of the Movement for the Actualization of the Sovereign State of Biafra but was split off in 2010 by British-Nigerian lawyer Benjamin Onwuka. The group was responsible for the 2014 Enugu Government House attack on March 7, 2014, and was behind an attack on a State Broadcasting Service office a few months later.

Onwuka was arrested in 2014 but was released three years later. Onwuka immediately returned to leading the BZM.

In June 2017 the group proclaimed the independence of Biafra and Onwuka as president.

References

Biafra
Rebel groups in Nigeria
Zionism in Africa